Motivate LLC (formerly Alta Bicycle Share and also Motivate International Inc.) is a company based in New York City that services bicycle sharing systems and other urban services in North America. 

The systems provide a flexible method for completing short trips, as contrasted with the longer rentals offered by traditional bike rental companies. In July 2018, a portion of the company was acquired by Lyft, with the service arm portion of the business staying private and renamed Motivate LLC.

History
Alta Bicycle Share was formed in 2010.

Motivate was listed in Fast Company's "World's Most Innovative Companies" for 2014 under its previous name.

In October 2014, it was announced that the company had been acquired by Bikeshare Holdings LLC and would be relocating headquarters from Portland, Oregon to New York City under the leadership of Jay Walder. Subsequently, Motivate announced its acquisition of 8D Technologies, the technology provider for a number of the systems it already operated, in February 2017. In July 2018, Lyft announced that it would acquire Motivate and continue to operate it as a standalone business.

Currently operating systems 
Motivate currently operates eight systems in public-private partnerships with local governments:
 Bay Wheels, in the San Francisco Bay Area, California, with bike stations in downtown San Francisco, San Jose, and East Bay, California.
 Biketown PDX in Portland, Oregon began operating in July 2016.
 Capital Bikeshare in Washington, D.C. with service to Washington, D.C., Arlington, VA, Alexandria, VA, Fairfax County, Virginia, and Montgomery County, Maryland
 Citi Bike in Manhattan, Brooklyn, Queens and Jersey City, New Jersey
 CoGo in Columbus, OH from Ohio State University to Schiller Park in German Village (and a separate system at Easton Town Center)
 Divvy in Chicago
 Bluebikes in the metro-Boston area (Boston, Brookline, Cambridge, and Somerville).

Discontinued systems  
 Bike Share Toronto in Toronto,
 Melbourne Bike Share in Melbourne, Australia, sold the system to RACV.
 Pronto Cycle Share in Seattle, Washington
 Bike Chattanooga in Chattanooga, TN
 Nice Ride Minnesota in Minneapolis and St Paul

Systems suppliers 
Motivate-operated systems have used multiple suppliers for bikes, stations, kiosks, and technology across each city including 8D Technologies and Montreal-based PBSC Urban Solutions for equipment and technology and Cycles Devinci and Arcade Cycles for bicycles.

See also 
List of bicycle sharing systems
Utility cycling – Short-term hire schemes

References

External links

Bicycle sharing companies
Companies based in Portland, Oregon
Transportation companies based in New York City
2018 mergers and acquisitions
Lyft